Good Hope, Mississippi may refer to the following places in the U.S. state of Mississippi:
Good Hope, Holmes County, Mississippi, an unincorporated community
Good Hope, Leake County, Mississippi, an unincorporated community
Good Hope, Marion County, Mississippi, an unincorporated community
Good Hope, Neshoba County, Mississippi, an unincorporated community
Good Hope, Perry County, Mississippi, an unincorporated community